Soubhagyavathi is 1957 Indian Tamil-language historical comedy film directed by Jampanna and produced by N. M. Naganna. The film dialogue was written by A. L. Narayanan and the story was written by Jampanna. Music was by Pendyala Nageswara Rao and M. S. Gnanamani. The film stars Gemini Ganesan Savitri, K. A. Thangavelu S. V. Ranga Rao and T. P. Muthulakshmi, playing lead, with O. A. K. Devar, Kaka Radhakrishnan, M. S. Draupadi and Suryakala in supporting roles. It was released on 22 October 1957.

Plot

Cast 
 Gemini Ganesan as Kalatharan
 Savitri as Gowri
 S. V. Ranga Rao as Maha Bhairavan, bad magician
 K. A. Thangavelu as Vairavan, Kalatharan's Friend
 T. P. Muthulakshmi as Maragatham, Thandavam's sister
 Kaka Radhakrishnan as Thandavam, Gowri's cousin
 K. Suryakala as Princess Kalavalli
 O. A. K. Thevar as Kasi King
 M. S. Draupadi as Saradha, Gowri's Mother
 C. K. Saraswathi as Maragatham & Thandavam's Mother
 S. V. Subbaiah as Kalatharan's father
 E. V. Saroja as Kalavalli's palace dancer
 P. Saraswathi
 Kamakshi
 M. E. Madhavan
 M. R. Santhanam
 A. K. Chopra
 Ramaiah Shashthri
 Stunt Somu
 Krishnan

Soundtrack 
Music composed by Pendyala Nageswara Rao and M. S. Gnanamani, with lyrics written by Pattukottai Kalyanasundaram, A. L. Narayanan and Ra. Pazhanisami. A song "Yedhuko, Iru Vizhi Marulum", written by Pattukottai Kalyanasundaram and sung by T. M. Soundararajan (in Raga Kalyani) was recorded and released as a vinyl record, but was not included in the film. M. S. Gnanamani composed music for only one song Ven Thamarai Raaniye in the raga Kalyani. A song Matha Maragatha from the Shyamala-Dandakam written by Kālidāsa was included in the film and sung by M. L. Vasanthakumari.

References

External links 
 

1950s historical comedy-drama films
1950s romantic comedy-drama films
1950s Tamil-language films
1957 films
Films scored by M. S. Gnanamani
Films scored by Pendyala Nageswara Rao
Indian black-and-white films
Indian historical comedy-drama films
Indian romantic comedy-drama films